Baron Phillimore, of Shiplake in the County of Oxford, is a title in the Peerage of the United Kingdom. It was created in 1918 for the former Judge of the High Court of Justice and Lord Justice of Appeal, Sir Walter Phillimore, 2nd Baronet. The Phillimore Baronetcy, of The Coppice, had been created in the Baronetage of the United Kingdom on 28 December 1881 for his father Sir Robert Phillimore, who was also a noted lawyer and judge. The first Baron was succeeded by his son, the second Baron.

On his death the titles passed to his grandson, the third Baron, his eldest son Captain the Hon. Anthony Francis Phillimore (d. 1940) having been killed in action during the Second World War. The third Baron was childless and was succeeded by his uncle, the fourth Baron. He was an architect.

 the titles are held by his son, the fifth Baron, who succeeded in 1994. The fifth baron is a barrister who lives at Coppid Hall, Shiplake, Oxfordshire.

Phillimore Estate
The Phillimore family were formerly owners, and now trustees, of the Phillimore Estate  in Kensington, west London, covering the prosperous 19th century houses around Holland Park and Campden Hill.

The family also controls Coppid Farming Enterprises, a landowner with an interest in the Crichel Down estate.

The fourth Baron owned Villa Foscari, a masterpiece of Palladio and now a Unesco World Heritage site.

Phillimore Baronets, of The Coppice (1881)
Sir Robert Joseph Phillimore, 1st Baronet (1810–1885)
Sir Walter George Frank Phillimore, 2nd Baronet (1845–1929) (created Baron Phillimore in 1918)

Barons Phillimore (1918)
Walter George Frank Phillimore, 1st Baron Phillimore (1845–1929)
Godfrey Walter Phillimore, 2nd Baron Phillimore (1879–1947)
Robert Godfrey Phillimore, 3rd Baron Phillimore (1939–1990)
Claud Stephen Phillimore, 4th Baron Phillimore (1911–1994)
Francis Stephen Phillimore, 5th Baron Phillimore (b. 1944)

The heir apparent is the present holder's son, the Hon. Tristan Anthony Stephen Phillimore (b. 1977)

References

Kidd, Charles, Williamson, David (editors). Debrett's Peerage and Baronetage (1990 edition). New York: St Martin's Press, 1990.

Baronies in the Peerage of the United Kingdom
1918 establishments in the United Kingdom
People from Oxfordshire
Noble titles created in 1918
People from Shiplake